Sir Ewen Broadbent,  (9 August 1924 – 27 February 1993) was a British civil servant who occupied a number of senior positions in the British government.

In retirement, he had an appointment as a director of one of Gerald Carroll's Carroll Group companies.

Appointments
Assistant Under-Secretary of State for Defence 1969-72
Deputy Under-Secretary of State (Air) 1972-75
Deputy Under-Secretary of State (Civilian Management) 1975-82
Second Permanent Under-Secretary of State 1982-84
Chairman Look Ahead Housing Association 1988-93
International Military Service Ltd 1991-93

References

Further reading
"An appreciation of sir Ewen Broadbent KCB CMG 1924–1993", The RUSI Journal, Volume 138, Issue 2, 1993.

1924 births
1993 deaths
British civil servants
Knights Commander of the Order of the Bath
Companions of the Order of St Michael and St George